TTC Berlin Eastside e.V. is a table tennis club based in the German capital Berlin. It is best known for its women's elite team, which is one of the strongest in Europe and won the ETTU Champions League both in 2012 and 2014. Additionally, it is a three time ETTU Cup winner, having obtained the title in 2002, 2004 and 2007. Besides, the club also has teams in lower leagues in both genders.

Team

Roster
Roster for the 2013–2014 season
 Irene Ivancan
 Georgina Póta
 Kristin Silbereisen
 Shan Xiaona

Staff members
 President: Alexander Teichmann
 Team Manager: Tanja Krämer
 Coach: Irina Palina
 Treasurer: Jürgen Heinrich
 Press Officer: Alexander Teichmann

Honors
ETTU Champions League:
Winner: 2012, 2014
ETTU Cup:
Winner: 2002, 2004, 2007

References

External links

Table tennis clubs in Germany